TruTV was a pay television channel owned by Turner Broadcasting System Asia. The channel aired "caught-on-video" reality programs, Adult Swim programs or as TruTV called it, "actuality" television.

As of 31 December 2018, the selected TruTV programmes is currently shown on Warner TV Asia.

See also 
truTV
Turner Broadcasting System

References 

Television channels and stations established in 2010
Warner Bros. Discovery Asia-Pacific
Mass media in Southeast Asia
Television channels and stations disestablished in 2018